The North Fellows Historic District is a historic district located in Ottumwa, Iowa, United States.  The city experienced a housing boom after World War II.  This north side neighborhood of single-family brick homes built between 1945 and 1959 exemplifies this development.  It was listed on the National Register of Historic Places in 2010.

References

Historic districts on the National Register of Historic Places in Iowa
Historic districts in Wapello County, Iowa
National Register of Historic Places in Wapello County, Iowa
Buildings and structures in Ottumwa, Iowa